The Sony NEX-C3 is a digital camera announced 8 June 2011. It is a mirrorless interchangeable lens camera with a compact form factor and APS-C size image sensor. The Sony camera was manufactured in Black, Silver, and Pink. This camera was unfairly compared against later models such as the NEX-5R using a body only weight of 225g compared the NEX-5R battery and card inclusive weight of 276g, which lead to the mistaken claim that the NEX-C3 was 51g lighter. The camera was later replaced by the NEX-F3.

See also
List of Sony E-mount cameras
Sony NEX-5

References 

NEX-C3
NEX-C3
Cameras introduced in 2011